Sabrina Man (born March 12, 2000) is a Chinese-Filipino actress, television host and commercial model. She was Little Miss Laguna 2007 and the first Little Earth Angel-Air (young counterparts of Miss Philippines Earth). She has starred in several independent films. She won her first best actress award in UP Short Film Festival for the film entitled Pers Lab.

She started her show business career in Princess Sarah in 2007. She also regularly appears on Umbrella Friend, a local TV show in Laguna. She was first recognized as young Serpina in the TV series Darna. She was chosen for the main cast in the GMA prime time series telefantasya Panday Kids. She was one of the hosts of Tropang Potchi aired on GMA TV.

Filmography

Television

Movies

Commercial

External links

2000 births
Living people
People from Laguna (province)
Filipino people of Chinese descent
Filipino television actresses
People from Quezon City
Filipino child actresses

GMA Network personalities
TV5 (Philippine TV network) personalities